Kenneth Brian Patterson (born July 8, 1964), is an American former professional baseball player who pitched in Major League Baseball from 1988-1994. He taught private lessons in the Central Texas area from 1998-2004 before beginning his coaching career as a rookie league pitching coach for the Batavia Muckdogs of the Philadelphia Phillies organization in 2005. Patterson then coached the Arkansas Travelers, a Los Angeles of Anaheim affiliate, from 2006 to 2010. He won the Texas League Mike Coolbaugh Coach of the Year award in 2009. Ken Patterson currently serves as a pitching coach for the McLennan Community College Highlanders in Waco, Texas, where he was a member of the 1983 NJCAA National Championship team.

See also
 Chicago White Sox all-time roster

References

External links
 Baseball Reference

1964 births
Living people
Albany-Colonie Yankees players
American expatriate baseball players in Canada
Baseball players from California
Baylor Bears baseball players
Chicago Cubs players
Chicago White Sox players
California Angels players
Fort Lauderdale Yankees players
Hawaii Islanders players
Iowa Cubs players
Lake Elsinore Storm players
Major League Baseball pitchers
McLennan Highlanders baseball players
Omaha Royals players
Oneonta Yankees players
People from Costa Mesa, California
Peoria Chiefs players
Sportspeople from Orange County, California
Vancouver Canadians players